Lamb's Theatre was an Off-Broadway theater located at 130 West 44th Street, Manhattan, New York City inside the Manhattan Church of the Nazarene, near Times Square in New York City. It seated approximately 350 and specialized in musical productions. The building was built in 1904–1905 and was designed by Stanford White as the headquarters of the theater club The Lambs.

In 2007, the venue was closed to make way for the Chatwal New York hotel.

History
The six-story Lambs Club Building originally housed a fraternal club of theater professionals called The Lambs, taking after a club in England started by Charles Lamb in 1868. The members included Fred Astaire, Mark Twain, and Douglas Fairbanks Jr.

In the mid-1970s, the Manhattan Church of the Nazarene bought the Lamb's building for the sake of making it into a mission. The Lambs club moved to 3 West 51st Street in 1975. In 1978, Lamb's Theatre Company was created by Carolyn Rossi Copeland and it hosted the successful "Broadway for Kids" series. In 1981, the renovated 3rd floor theatre had its first show, Cotton Patch Gospel and was penned the "Gem of Times Square". With a list of over 50 productions or stages, in 1984 they opened a Lamb's Little Theatre on the first floor.

Performance history

 1981: Cotton Patch Gospel
 1982: Snoopy! The Musical
 1982: Puff The Magic Dragon
 1983: Breakfast with Les and Bess 
 1983: Painting Churches
 1984: The Gift of the Magi
 1985: Dames at Sea
 1986: The Alchemedians
 1986: Olympus on My Mind
 1987: Funny Feet
 1988: Godspell
 1990: Smoke On The Mountain
 1992: Opal
 1991: Final Departure
 1993: Johnny Pye and the Fool-Killer
 1996: I Do! I Do!
 1999: Thoroughly Modern Millie
 2000: The Countess
 2002: The Prince and the Pauper
 2003: That Day in September
 2004: Silent Laughter
 2004: Children's Letters to God
 2004: Cam Jansen
 2005: Picon Pie
 2006: The Man in the Iron Mask

References

External links
Lamb's Theatre

Off-Broadway theaters
1981 establishments in New York City
2007 disestablishments in New York (state)